Group 6 was one of six groups of national teams competing in the First group stage of the 1982 FIFA World Cup. Play began on 14 June and ended on 23 June 1982. The group consisted of four teams: Seeded team Brazil, the Soviet Union, Scotland and World Cup debutants New Zealand.

Brazil won the group with three consecutive victories and advanced to the second round, along with the Soviet Union, who finished ahead of Scotland by virtue of goal difference.

Standings

Matches

Brazil vs Soviet Union

Scotland vs New Zealand

Brazil vs Scotland

Soviet Union vs New Zealand

Soviet Union vs Scotland

Brazil vs New Zealand

References

External links
 1982 FIFA World Cup archive
 Spain 1982 FIFA Technical Report: Statistical Details of the Matches pp. 129-133

1982 FIFA World Cup
Group
Group
Soviet Union at the 1982 FIFA World Cup
New Zealand at the 1982 FIFA World Cup